The following is a list of cancer types. Cancer is a group of diseases that involve abnormal increases in the number of cells, with the potential to invade or spread to other parts of the body. Not all tumors or lumps are cancerous; benign tumors are not classified as being cancer because they do not spread to other parts of the body. There are over 100 different known cancers that affect humans.

Cancers are often described by the body part that they originated in.  However, some body parts contain multiple types of tissue, so for greater precision, cancers are additionally classified by the type of cell that the tumor cells originated from. These types include:
 Carcinoma: Cancers derived from epithelial cells. This group includes many of the most common cancers that occur in older adults. Nearly all cancers developing in the breast, prostate, lung, pancreas, and colon are carcinomas.
 Sarcoma: Cancers arising from connective tissue (i.e. bone, cartilage, fat, nerve), each of which develop from cells originating in mesenchymal cells outside of the bone marrow.
 Lymphoma and leukemia: These two classes of cancer arise from immature cells that originate in the bone marrow, and are intended to fully differentiate and mature into normal components of the immune system and the blood, respectively. Acute lymphoblastic leukemia is the most common type of cancer in children, accounting for ~30% of cases.  However, far more adults than children develop lymphoma and leukemia.
 Germ cell tumor: Cancers derived from pluripotent cells, most often presenting in the testicle or the ovary (seminoma and dysgerminoma, respectively).
 Blastoma: Cancers derived from immature "precursor" cells or embryonic tissue. Blastomas are generally more common in children (e.g. neuroblastoma, retinoblastoma, nephroblastoma, hepatoblastoma, medulloblastoma, etc.) than in older adults.

Cancers are usually named using -carcinoma, -sarcoma or -blastoma as a suffix, with the Latin or Greek word for the organ or tissue of origin as the root. For example, the most common cancer of the liver parenchyma ("hepato-" = liver), arising from malignant epithelial cells ("carcinoma"), would be called a hepatocarcinoma, while a malignancy arising from primitive liver precursor cells is called a hepatoblastoma. Similarly, a cancer arising from malignant fat cells would be termed a liposarcoma. 

For some common cancers, the English organ name is used. For example, the most common type of breast cancer is called ductal carcinoma of the breast. 

Benign tumors (which are not cancers) are usually named using -oma as a suffix with the organ name as the root. For example, a benign tumor of smooth muscle cells is called a leiomyoma (the common name of this frequently occurring benign tumor in the uterus is fibroid). Confusingly, some types of cancer use the -noma suffix, examples including melanoma and seminoma.

Some types of cancer are named for the size and shape of the cells under a microscope, such as giant cell carcinoma, spindle cell carcinoma, and small-cell carcinoma.

Bone and muscle  sarcoma  
 Chondrosarcoma
 Ewing's sarcoma 
 Malignant fibrous histiocytoma of bone/osteosarcoma
 Osteosarcoma
 Rhabdomyosarcoma
 Leiomyosarcoma
 Myxosarcoma
 Fibrocartilaginous mesenchymoma of bone

Brain and nervous system 
 Astrocytoma
 Brainstem glioma
 Pilocytic astrocytoma
 Ependymoma
 Primitive neuroectodermal tumor
 Cerebellar astrocytoma
 Cerebral astrocytoma
Glioblastoma
 Glioma
 Medulloblastoma
 Neuroblastoma
 Oligodendroglioma
 Pineal astrocytoma
 Pituitary adenoma
 Visual pathway and hypothalamic glioma

Breast 
 Breast cancer 
 Inflammatory breast cancer 
 Invasive lobular carcinoma
 Tubular carcinoma
 Invasive cribriform carcinoma of the breast (also termed invasive cribriform carcinoma)
 Medullary carcinoma
 Male breast cancer
 Phyllodes tumor
 Mammary secretory carcinoma
 Papillary carcinomas of the breast

Endocrine system 
 Adrenocortical carcinoma
 Islet cell carcinoma (endocrine pancreas)
 Multiple endocrine neoplasia syndrome
 Pancreatic Cancer
 Parathyroid cancer
 Pheochromocytoma
 Thyroid cancer
 Merkel cell carcinoma

Eye 
 Uveal melanoma
 Retinoblastoma
 Optic nerve glioma

Gastrointestinal 
 Anal cancer
 Appendix cancer
 Cholangiocarcinoma
 Carcinoid tumor, gastrointestinal
 Colon cancer
 Extrahepatic bile duct cancer
 Gallbladder cancer
 Gastric (stomach) cancer
 Gastrointestinal carcinoid tumor
 Gastrointestinal stromal tumor (GIST)
 Hepatocellular cancer
 Pancreatic cancer, islet cell
 Rectal cancer
Small intestine cancer

Genitourinary and gynecologic 
 Bladder cancer
 Cervical cancer
 Endometrial cancer
 Extragonadal germ cell tumor
 Ovarian cancer
 Ovarian epithelial cancer (surface epithelial-stromal tumor)
 Ovarian germ cell tumor
 Penile cancer
Kidney cancer
 Renal cell carcinoma
 Renal pelvis and ureter, transitional cell cancer*
 Prostate cancer
 Testicular cancer
 Gestational trophoblastic tumor
 Ureter and renal pelvis,
 transitional cell cancer(urothelial carcinoma)
 Urethral cancer
 Uterine sarcoma
 Vaginal cancer
 Vulvar cancer
 Wilms tumor (nephroblastoma)

Head and neck 
 Esophageal cancer
 Head and neck cancer
 Nasopharyngeal carcinoma
 Oral cancer
 Oropharyngeal cancer
 Paranasal sinus and nasal cavity cancer
 Pharyngeal cancer
 Salivary gland cancer
 Hypopharyngeal cancer

Hematopoietic 
 Acute biphenotypic leukemia
 Acute eosinophilic leukemia
 Acute lymphoblastic leukemia
 Acute myeloid leukemia
 Acute myeloid dendritic cell leukemia
 AIDS-related lymphoma
 Anaplastic large cell lymphoma
 Angioimmunoblastic T-cell lymphoma
 B-cell prolymphocytic leukemia
 Burkitt's lymphoma
 Chronic lymphocytic leukemia
 Chronic myelogenous leukemia
 Cutaneous T-cell lymphoma
 Diffuse large B-cell lymphoma
 Follicular lymphoma
 Hairy cell leukemia
 Hepatosplenic T-cell lymphoma
 Hodgkin's lymphoma
 Intravascular large B-cell lymphoma
 Large granular lymphocytic leukemia
 Lymphoplasmacytic lymphoma
 Lymphomatoid granulomatosis
 Mantle cell lymphoma
 Marginal zone B-cell lymphoma
 Mast cell leukemia
 Mediastinal large B cell lymphoma
 Multiple myeloma/plasma cell neoplasm
 Myelodysplastic syndromes
 Mucosa-associated lymphoid tissue lymphoma
 Mycosis fungoides
 Nodal marginal zone B cell lymphoma
 Non-Hodgkin lymphoma
 Precursor B lymphoblastic leukemia
 Primary central nervous system lymphoma
 Primary cutaneous follicular lymphoma
 Primary cutaneous immunocytoma
 Primary effusion lymphoma
 Plasmablastic lymphoma
 Sézary syndrome
 Splenic marginal zone lymphoma
 T-cell prolymphocytic leukemia

Skin 
 Basal cell carcinoma
 Squamous cell carcinoma
Squamous cell skin cancer
 Skin adnexal tumors (e.g. sebaceous carcinoma)
 Melanoma
 Merkel cell carcinoma
Keratoacanthoma
 Sarcomas of primary cutaneous origin (e.g. dermatofibrosarcoma protuberans)
 Lymphomas of primary cutaneous origin (e.g. mycosis fungoides)

Thoracic and respiratory 
 Adenocarcinoma of the lung
Bronchial adenomas/carcinoids
 Small cell lung cancer
 Mesothelioma
 Non-small cell lung cancer
Non-small cell lung carcinoma
 Pleuropulmonary blastoma
 Laryngeal cancer
 Thymoma and thymic carcinoma
Squamous-cell carcinoma of the lung

HIV/AIDS related 
 AIDS-related cancers
 Kaposi sarcoma

Unsorted (so far) 
 Epithelioid hemangioendothelioma (EHE)
 Desmoplastic small round cell tumor
 Liposarcoma

See also
 Lists of diseases
 List of oncology-related terms

References
  National Cancer Institute

External links 

Cancer types